Coton Clanford is a small dispersed Staffordshire village lying in gently rolling countryside 3 miles due west of Stafford, England and 1 mile southeast of Seighford. The name of the village is sometimes hyphenated to Coton-Clanford, appearing this way on some cottage names locally. The population for this village as taken at the 2011 census can be found under Seighford. It lies midway between the B5405 road, 1½ miles to the north and the A518 1½ miles to the south. The village has no shops, public houses or church, comprising only a few scattered houses and cottages, several dairy farms and a long disused 19th century chapel.

This Primitive Methodist chapel was built in 1884, the foundation stone being laid 30 October 1884. The Chapel records 1891–1907, Coton Clanford Society and Methodist chapel minute books, 1903–1929, are stored at Stafford Record Office. Judging from the very modest dimensions of this small building it is hard to imagine it having the capacity for a congregation of more than 30 worshippers.

The village straddles Clanford Brook, which meanders southeastwards from Ranton towards Little Aston and Doxey and is bounded to the north by the southeastern edge of Seighford airfield and several large woods.

In this village the English philosopher and cleric, William Wollaston, was born in 1659.

Clanford Hall
Located here also is Clanford Hall, a three-storey, half-timbered Tudor mansion in fine condition now used as a farmhouse. The building, dated 1684, is listed Grade II* and is a good example of 17th century vernacular architecture of the area. It is timber framed with a tiled roof and brick stacks, with  two storeys and an attic, and four-storeyed on the East. It is restored in brick and colour-washed, with wood finials to gables and ornamental timbering at front and restored timbering at rear. There are casements and wood mullioned windows with modern leaded lights. The house has exposed ceiling beams.

References

External links 

Borough of Stafford
Villages in Staffordshire